Stefan Zinni (born 6 July 1996) is an Australian professional footballer who plays as a winger for Avondale. He has previously played for Melbourne City, Western Sydney Wanderers, and Western United in the A-League.

Club career

Melbourne City
On 26 August 2015, he made his professional senior debut for Melbourne City in the 2015 FFA Cup against Wellington Phoenix. On 10 October 2015, he made his A-league debut against Sydney FC at Allianz Stadium.

South Melbourne
On 18 December 2016, Zinni signed with South Melbourne where he played 10 years in his youth.

Western Sydney Wanderers
On 1 February, Zinni was signed by Western Sydney Wanderers until the end of the season to help bolster their attack.

Western United
On 28 December 2020, Zinni was signed by Western United on a 2-month injury replacement deal.

External links

References

1996 births
Living people
Association football defenders
Australian soccer players
Melbourne City FC players
South Melbourne FC players
Western Sydney Wanderers FC players
Avondale FC players
Western United FC players
National Premier Leagues players
A-League Men players